Yarck railway station is a former railway station in Yarck, Victoria, Australia. The station was opened in November 1890 when the branch line from Tallarook was extended to Merton. After the station closed along with the line in 1978, the main station building was sold and moved elsewhere. A goods shed, and a passenger shelter in poor condition, remain at the site of the station.

References

See also
Victorian Railway Stations - Yarck

Railway stations in Australia opened in 1890
Railway stations closed in 1978
Disused railway stations in Victoria (Australia)
Mansfield railway line